In Slovene folklore, Goldhorn or Goldenhorn is a legendary white chamois buck, or alternatively, an Alpine ibex, that had his realm in the heights of Mount Triglav. The legend is well known throughout Slovenia (specifically Carinthia), as well as in Austrian Carinthia, and Italian Friuli-Venezia Giulia.

The story about Zlatorog was first written down, adapted to the late Romantic style and published by Karl Deschmann (Karel Dežman) in the Laibacher Zeitung, no. 43, on 21 February 1868.

Story

Summary of the story as written by Karl Deschmann
Goldhorn's golden horns were the key to a treasure hidden in the mountains around Triglav. A young and brave hunter from the Trenta Valley fell in love with a beautiful girl and managed to win her heart by bringing her beautiful flowers. However, one day, a rich merchant from Venice came by and tried to gain her attention by giving her golden jewelry and dancing with her. As the hunter approached the girl, she mocked him. The hunter was desperate and left. Persuaded by another hunter, called the green hunter, who was said to have brought about the fate of several honest boys, he decided to go that very night to find Goldhorn and claim his treasure. In the morning, they found the animal, shot it, and pursued it. The dying animal dragged itself onto a narrow, rocky ledge. Suddenly the boy saw on a dangerous trail the most beautiful and healing flowers. The green hunter forced him on to catch the Goldhorn before it ate the magic Triglav flowers that grew from its blood, but it was too late. The Goldhorn had already eaten one and the flower gave it tremendous life power. It ran towards the hunter, who being blinded by the bliss of its golden horns, lost balance and fell from the mountain. The river Soča brought his corpse to the vale.

Recasts
The story of Goldhorn was put into verses by Rudolf Baumbach and published in 1877, becoming his most popular work. It was turned into an opera by Camilla and Eduard Lucerna.

Cultural references
The first Slovene-language, full-length film, recorded in 1931 by Janko Ravnik, was titled In the Kingdom of the Goldhorn.

Zlatorog is also a brand of beer produced by the Laško Brewery.

See also
 Heathen Maiden

References

External links 
 Baumbach, Rudolf. Zlatorog. Eine Alpensage. Der Spiegel. Verlag von A.G. Liebeskind. 1882. (German)

Mythological caprids
Slovene mythology
Slovenian literature
Triglav
Folklore of Upper Carniola
Slavic legendary creatures
Mythological deer